The see of Tyre was one of the most ancient dioceses in Christianity. The existence of a Christian community there already in the time of Saint Paul is mentioned in the Acts of the Apostles. Seated at Tyre, which was the capital of the Roman province of Phoenicia Prima, the bishopric was a metropolitan see. Its position was briefly challenged by the see of Berytus in the mid-5th century; but after 480/1 the metropolitan of Tyre established himself as the first (protothronos) of all the metropolitans subject to the Patriarch of Antioch.

In the summer of 2017 a Greek inscription, five-metres long, naming Irenaeus as bishop of Tyre, was found west of the Sea of Galilee, in an excavation co-directed by historian Jacob Ashkenazi and archaeologist Mordechai Aviam. Since the inscription provides the date of the church's completion as 445, it gives credence to a date as early as 444 CE for his ordination.

History
Communion with the see of Rome was broken following the East–West Schism. When the Crusaders conquered Tyre, the Eastern Orthodox archbishop withdrew to Constantinople and a Latin named Eudes was appointed archbishop, but he died in 1124, the same year in which the Crusaders succeeded in taking the city.

The most notable of the Latin archbishops of Tyre of this time was the historian William of Tyre, who served from 1175 to 1185.

Tyre then belonged to the Kingdom of Jerusalem, not the more northerly Principality of Antioch. On the basis of the Pentarchy system, the Latin Patriarch of Antioch claimed the right to appoint the archbishop, which was exercised by the Latin Patriarch of Jerusalem. Pope Innocent II adjudicated the dispute in favour of Jerusalem on the basis of a decree of Pope Paschal II granting King Baldwin the right to make all sees conquered from the Muslims subject to Jerusalem. It was the practice to choose as Latin Patriarch of Jerusalem the archbishop of Tyre or of Caesarea in Palaestina.

In 1187, after Saladin's invasion, Tyre was the only city remaining in Crusader hands and was at one point considered as the new capital of the kingdom. It lost that appellation to Acre, but it remained the site of the coronation of the king, and the archbishop was given the responsibility of officiating at the coronation.

Starting with Sultan Baibars in 1254, the Islamic chieftains declared jihad on the Crusaders and slowly started exterminating the remaining Christian communities on the coastlands. The last archbishops, John and Bonacourt, devoted their rule to forestalling the Mamluk conquest, attempting to obtain the freedom of enslaved Christians, caring for refugees, and preparing for the coming assault. After a long siege, the city was captured by the Mamluks in 1291. The city was mostly evacuated by the time the Mamluks arrived, but the remaining population, including the archbishop, were killed or enslaved. The churches were torn down, and the archdiocese became titular; only in the 18th and 19th centuries was a new archbishop appointed to protect the newly restored pilgrim routes.  Due to the ongoing conflict and dislocations in modern Lebanon and the decline of influence of Christianity there, the see has remained vacant again since 1984.

Early bishops or archbishops of Tyre

Cassius ( 190 AD)
Marinus ( 250)
Tyrannio, martyred under Diocletian
Dorotheus I, martyred under Julian the Apostate
Paulinus
Zeno I (mentioned in 325)
Paulus (mentioned in 335)
Vitalis (mentioned in 344), an Arian
Uranius (mentioned in 359), an Arian
Zeno II (before 366–381)
Diodorus (381–?)
Reverentius †
Cyrus (?–431, deposed at the Council of Ephesus as a supporter of Nestorius
Berenicianus (431–?)
Irenaeus (in or before 445–449), a Nestorian
Photius ( 449)
Dorotheus II (mentioned in 458)
John Codonatus (before 482 – c. 488), who became Patriarch of Antioch
Epiphanius (mentioned in 518)
Eusebius (mentioned in 553)
Thomas (before 869 – after 879)

Latin archbishops of Tyre

 Odo (c. 1122–1123 or 1124)
 William I (c. 1127–1135)
 Fulcher (c. 1135–1146)
 Ralph (1146–1150) (elected archbishop, who was not consecrated)
 Peter I (1151–1164)
 Frederick (1164–1174)
 William II (1175–1186) (historian)
 Joscius (1186–1202)
 Clarembaud of Broies (1202–1215)
 Simon of Maugastel (c. 1216–1229)
 Hugh (c. 1231–c. 1234)
 Peter II of Sargines (1235–1244)
 Philip of Tripoli (elected archbishop, disputed, resigned 1250)
 Nicholas Larcat (1251–1253)
 Gilles (1253–1266)
 John of Saint Maxentius (1267–1272)
 Bonacursus de Gloire (1272–1295)
Joseph Simon Assemani (titular, 18th century)
Annibale della Genga (titular, 1793–1816)
Giacomo Giustiniani (1817–1826)
Domenico Maria Jacobini (1881–1896)
Franz Xaver Nagl (1910–1911, later Archbishop of Vienna)
Vittorio Ranuzzi de' Bianchi (1911–1916)
Rodolfo Caroli (1917–1921)
Pietro Benedetti (1921–1930)
Egidio Lari (1931–1965)
Bruno Wüstenberg (1966–1984)

References

External links
Tyre from the Catholic Encyclopedia

Tyre, Archbishopric of
Tyre, Archbishopric of
Tyre
Tyre, Lebanon